Ostional Mixed Wildlife Refuge, is an  Wildlife refuge of Costa Rica, part of the Tempisque Conservation Area, was originally declared a protected area in 1982, and its status has been changed several times since then, including covering a larger area both on land and out to sea. It was created to protect important nesting beaches of the Olive ridley sea turtle (Lepidochelys olivacea).

According to the World Wildlife Fund, the Refuge is “one of the two most important areas in the world for nesting of the Olive Ridley turtle.”

References

External links
Ostional Wildlife Refuge via Costa Rica National Parks
Hundreds of Turtles Arrive in Ostional via The Costa Rica News
Playa Ostional – The Sustainable Community via That Journey Blog
Asociación de Desarollo Integral Ostional (ADIO), official page

Nature reserves in Costa Rica
Geography of Guanacaste Province